Olden is an unincorporated community in Howell County, in the U.S. state of Missouri. Olden is located just east of U.S. Route 63, approximately two miles south of Pomona.

History
Olden was platted in 1882, and named after Benjamin Olden, a railroad official. A post office called Olden was established in 1883, and remained in operation until 1951.

References

Unincorporated communities in Howell County, Missouri
Unincorporated communities in Missouri